The 1968 Cork Junior Football Championship was the 70th staging of the Cork Junior A Football Championship since its establishment by Cork County Board in 1895.

The final was played on 17 November 1968 at Sam Maguire Park in Dunmanway, between Canovee and Adrigole, in what was their first ever meeting in the final. Canovee won the match by 3-06 to 1-11 to claim their second championship title overall and a first title in 18 years.

Results

Quarter-finals

Semi-finals

Final

References

1968 in Irish sport
Cork Junior Football Championship